Rehan Ahmed (born 13 August 2004) is an English cricketer. He made his international debut against Pakistan on 17 December 2022, becoming England men's youngest Test debutant at the age of 18 years and 126 days. On the third day of the match he also became the youngest debutant to take five wickets in an innings in men’s Tests. On 12 March 2023, Ahmed became the youngest England male cricketer to play in all three formats of international cricket.

Early life
His father Naeem Ahmed, a former cricketer, was born in Pakistan, where he played as a fast-bowling all-rounder, before moving to England. His brothers Farhan and Raheem are also cricketers.

Ahmed was in the youth set up at Nottinghamshire but left to join Leicestershire in 2017. Aged 13  he was already billed as one of the brightest prospects in English cricket having been invited to bowl at England and West Indies at Lord's and clean bowled Ben Stokes.

Career
He made his List A debut on 25 July 2021, for Leicestershire in the 2021 Royal London One-Day Cup. Prior to his List A debut, Ahmed was named in the County Select XI squad to play against India during their tour of England.

Ahmed was part of England's squad for the 2022 ICC Under-19 Cricket World Cup in the West Indies in early 2022. He played in four of his team's six matches, taking 12 wickets, as England finished as runners-up to India.

In April 2022, he was bought by the Southern Brave for the 2022 season of The Hundred. Later the same month, he signed a contract extension to the end of 2026 with Leicestershire. 

Ahmed made his first-class debut on 19 May 2022, for Leicestershire in the 2022 County Championship, 
and his Twenty20 debut for the same team a week later.

In November 2022, he was added to the England squad for the away Test series against Pakistan. He made his Test debut in the third Test of the series, on 17 December 2022. He became the youngest male cricketer for England to make his debut in Tests, achieving the milestone at the age of 18 years and 126 days. During Pakistan's second innings, Ahmed took his first five–wicket haul in Tests, and became the youngest debutant to achieve a five-wicket haul in men’s Tests.

In December 2022, he was shortlisted for that year's BBC Young Sports Personality of the Year Award.

In February 2023, he was named in England's One Day International (ODI) and Twenty20 International (T20I) squad for the series against Bangladesh. He made his ODI debut in the third ODI of the series, on 6 March 2023. He became the youngest male cricketer for England to make his debut in ODIs, achieving the milestone at the age 18 years and 205 days. He made his T20I debut in the second T20I of the series, on 12 March 2023.
He became the youngest male cricketer for England to make his debut in T20Is, achieving the milestone at the age 18 years and 211 days.

References

External links
 

2004 births
Living people
English people of Pakistani descent
British sportspeople of Pakistani descent
British Asian cricketers
Cricketers from Nottingham
English cricketers
Leicestershire cricketers
Southern Brave cricketers
England Test cricketers